Carlo Antonio Ripa (1582–1641) was a Roman Catholic prelate who served as Bishop of Mondovi (1632–1641).

Biography
Carlo Antonio Ripa was born in 1582.
On 19 Jan 1632, he was appointed during the papacy of Pope Urban VIII as Bishop of Mondovi.
On 25 Jan 1632, he was consecrated bishop by Antonio Marcello Barberini, Cardinal-Priest of Sant'Onofrio, with Antonio Provana, Archbishop of Turin, and Giovanni Francesco Passionei, Bishop of Cagli, serving as co-consecrators. 
He served as Bishop of Mondovi until his death on 20 Sep 1641.

References

External links and additional sources
 (for Chronology of Bishops) 
 (for Chronology of Bishops) 

17th-century Italian Roman Catholic bishops
Bishops appointed by Pope Urban VIII
1582 births
1641 deaths